Hidden Treasure may refer to:
 Parable of the Hidden Treasure, a well known parable of Jesus
 A Hidden Treasure, an important hadith (tradition) in Sufism
 Buried treasure, a popular belief surrounding pirates and Old West outlaws
 Hidden Treasure (horse), a Canadian Champion Thoroughbred racehorse
 Hidden Treasure (album)

See also
Hidden Treasures (disambiguation)